The 52 members of the Parliament of Vanuatu from 2012 to 2016 were elected on 30 October 2012.

List of members

References

 2012